Adam Szłapka (born 6 December 1984, Kościan) is a Polish politician and political scientist, Member of the Polish Parliament and leader of the Modern (Nowoczesna) political party.

Early life and education
Szłapka was born on 6 December 1984 in Kościan, Greater Poland Voivodeship. He graduated from the Oskar Kolberg High School No. 1 in Kościan. He subsequently graduated in political science and Eastern studies from the Adam Mickiewicz University in Poznań. He is married to Galyna Chyzh.

Political career
He was an activist of Młode Centrum, a youth organization of the Freedom Union and Democratic Party. Between 2006-2012 he worked as the general secretary of these organizations. Between 2006-2010, he served as town councillor in Kościan representing the Self-Government Democratic Forum (Samorządowe Forum Demokratyczne). In 2010, he unsuccessfully ran for office in the local government elections. He was director of the Fundacja: Projekt Polska. In the years 2011-2015, he worked as an expert in the Chancellery of the President Bronisław Komorowski.

In 2015, he assumed the post of general secretary of the Modern (.Nowoczesna) party. The same year, he stood for election to the Sejm and won a seat from the Kalisz constituency. He was appointed a member of the Foreign Affairs Parliamentary Committee as well as the Secret Service Committee. In the 2019 Polish parliamentary election, he was re-elected as member of parliament receiving 51,951 votes in the Poznań constituency.

On 24 November 2019, he replaced Katarzyna Lubnauer as leader of the Modern political party. He has expressed his support for the legalization of same-sex marriage in Poland.

See also
Politics of Poland

References

Living people
1984 births
Polish politicians
Modern (political party) politicians
Adam Mickiewicz University in Poznań alumni
People from Kościan